The 2nd annual Billboard Latin Music Awards which honor the most popular albums, songs, and performers in Latin music took place in Miami.

Pop

Song of the year

 "Vida", La Mafia

Pop album of the year, Male
Luis Miguel — Segundo Romance

Pop album of the year, female
"Guitar Passion", Charo

Pop album of the year, duo or group
"Love and Liberté", Gipsy Kings

Pop album of the year, new artist
"Clásicos de la Provincia", Carlos Vives

Pop video of the year
"Matador", Los Fabulosos Cadillacs

Tropical/Salsa

Tropical/salsa song of the year

"Viviré", Juan Luis Guerra

Tropical/salsa album of the year, male
"Cara de Niño", Jerry Rivera

Tropical/salsa album of the year, female
"Dicen Que Soy", La India

Tropical/salsa album of the year, duo or group
"Fogaraté", Juan Luis Guerra

Tropical/salsa album of the year, new artist
"Master Sessions, Volume 1", Cachao

Tropical/salsa video of the year
"Dicen Que Soy", La India

Regional Mexican

Regional Mexican song of the year
"Amor Prohibido", Selena

Regional Mexican album of the year, male
"Recordando A Los Panchos", Vicente Fernández

Regional Mexican album of the year, female
"Amor Prohibido", Selena

Regional Mexican album of the year, duo or group

"Los Dos Plebes", Los Tigres del Norte

Regional Mexican album of the year, new artist
"La Diferencia", La Diferencia

Regional Mexican video of the year
"No Me Queda Más", Selena

Other awards

Hot latin tracks artists of the year
Selena

Latin rap album of the year
"Es Mundial", El General

Latin rock album of the year
"El nervio del volcán", Caifanes

Latin pop/rock album of the year
"Maná en Vivo", Maná

Latin jazz album of the year
Danzón (Dance On), Arturo Sandoval

Billboard Lifetime achievement award
Tito Puente

Billboard Latin Music Hall of Fame
Selena

References

Billboard Latin Music Awards
Latin Billboard Music Awards
Latin Billboard Music Awards
Billboard Music Awards
Latin Billboard Music